Leandro Ribeiro Sena (born 8 August 1976), is a Brazilian football manager and former player who played as a defensive midfielder. He is the current manager of América de Natal.

Club career statistics

Honours

Player 
 América de Natal 
 Copa RN: 2006

Coach 
 Confiança
 Campeonato Sergipano: 2017

 América de Natal 
 Campeonato Brasileiro Série D: 2022

References

External links
 

1976 births
Living people
Brazilian footballers
Brazilian football managers
Brazilian expatriate footballers
Expatriate footballers in Spain
Expatriate footballers in Saudi Arabia
Campeonato Brasileiro Série A players
Campeonato Brasileiro Série B players
La Liga players
Saudi Professional League players
Campeonato Brasileiro Série B managers
Campeonato Brasileiro Série C managers
Campeonato Brasileiro Série D managers
America Football Club (RJ) players
Associação Esportiva Araçatuba players
Mirassol Futebol Clube players
Mérida UD footballers
CA Osasuna players
Elche CF players
Ituano FC players
Goytacaz Futebol Clube players
Americano Futebol Clube players
América Futebol Clube (RN) players
Volta Redonda FC players
Al-Raed FC players
Treze Futebol Clube players
ABC Futebol Clube players
América Futebol Clube (RN) managers
Treze Futebol Clube managers
Associação Desportiva Recreativa e Cultural Icasa managers
Globo Futebol Clube managers
Associação Desportiva Confiança managers
Association football midfielders
Sportspeople from Rio de Janeiro (state)
People from São João da Barra